Puerto Cancún is a 800-acre upscale development in Cancún next to the ocean that contains a marina, private canals, a shopping mall, an IMAX theater, a golf course, hotels, condominiums, and spaces for retail businesses. The multimillion-dollar development project was originated as a partnership between Fonatur, Mexico's National Trust Fund for Tourism Development, and Michael Eugene Kelly, the CEO, president and principal promoter who had been convicted of a Ponzi scheme. It had been advertised in 2010 as a continuing development and gated community offering luxury and security.

The Puerto Cancún development was designed by the EDSA and Humberto Artigas as a master planned resort community with a variety of living options. Guests can vacation at the resort for short term stays at the hotels, purchase a time-share, or  buy a their own residence, with the option of purchasing a building lot to build a home to their own specifications. The development provides a variety of amenities for guests and homeowners, including a golf course designed by Tom Weiskopf, a 270-acre ecological reserve, a full-service marina, a club house with a spa, family areas, adult and children’s pools, and full beach access.  Due to ongoing construction, not all amenities may be available at this time.

References

External links
 Puerto Cancún, a city within the city 

Cancún
Planned developments
Port cities and towns of the Mexican Gulf Coast